Spilosoma alticola is a moth in the  family Erebidae. It was described by Alois Friedrich Rogenhofer in 1891. It is found in Tanzania.

References

Moths described in 1891
alticola